Lajos Kelemen (born 8 June 1929) is a Hungarian former sports shooter. He competed in the 50 metre pistol event at the 1964 Summer Olympics.

References

External links
 

1929 births
Possibly living people
Hungarian male sport shooters
Olympic shooters of Hungary
Shooters at the 1964 Summer Olympics
Sportspeople from Bucharest